Whitney Mansion, also known as Hollybush Mansion, is a historic house located on the campus of Rowan University in Glassboro in Gloucester County, New Jersey. It was used as the Rowan University President's Residence until 1998. Since 2003, Rowan University has spent more than $3 million to restore the mansion. It is now being used as a meeting place and museum.

Originally the home of the Whitney family, it was the first of its kind in South Jersey. It set a certain precedent with its Italianate architectural style, and its interior decorations attest to this precedent. Two of these significantly unique features of the house are the trompe de l'oeil ceilings in the parlor as well as the Summit Room, and the painted glass archway above and around the front door. The stone used in construction of Hollybush was New Jersey Ironstone, a sedimentary type stone found in the low hills and ridges of South Jersey.

In 1967, the mansion hosted the Glassboro Summit Conference, a summit meeting between United States President Lyndon B. Johnson and Soviet Union Premier Alexei Kosygin.

The mansion was built in 1849 and was added to the National Register of Historic Places on December 5, 1972, for its significance in architecture and politics/government.

See also
Rowan University
National Register of Historic Places listings in Gloucester County, New Jersey

References

External links
 
 

Houses on the National Register of Historic Places in New Jersey
Houses completed in 1849
Houses in Gloucester County, New Jersey
Rowan University
Glassboro, New Jersey
National Register of Historic Places in Gloucester County, New Jersey
1849 establishments in New Jersey
New Jersey Register of Historic Places
Stone houses in New Jersey
Italianate architecture in New Jersey